Acanthocercus ceriacoi, is a species of lizard in the family Agamidae.

References

Acanthocercus
Reptiles described in 2022
Taxobox binomials not recognized by IUCN